Hampton Park Secondary College is a secondary college in Melbourne. It was established in 1986, and is located next to River Gum Primary School.

References

Public high schools in Melbourne
Educational institutions established in 1986
1986 establishments in Australia